Mário Schoemberger (February 5, 1952 - May 14, 2008) was a Brazilian film, television and theater actor.

In his last film role, Schoemberger was personally cast in the 2007 film, O Cheiro do Ralo, by its director, Heitor Dhalia. He appeared in the film opposite actor Selton Mello. On television, Schoemberger also appeared in Vidas Opostas as Sérgio Ventura. His other film and television roles included Trair e Coçar É Só Começar, Da Cor do Pecado, Minha Nada Mole Vida and Os Aspones.

Mário Schoemberger had been hospitalized at the Hospital Nossa Senhora das Graças in Curitiba, Brazil, since December 2007 for treatment of cancer. Several of his friends, including Brazilian comedians Hélio Barbosa, Fábio Silvestre and Diogo Portugal organized a fundraising named Os Amigos do Mário (Mario's Friends) to help to pay for the cost of his medical expenses. Schoemberger died on May 14, 2008, at the age of 56.

Television roles 
 2006 - Vidas Opostas .... Sérgio Ventura
 2005 - A Grande Família
 2005 - A Diarista .... Dom Diego
 2004 - Da Cor do Pecado .... Borja
 2004 - Os Aspones .... Sr. Góes
 2002 - O Beijo do Vampiro .... Professor Antunes
 2002 - Desejos de Mulher .... Coelho Leite
 2000 - Vidas Cruzadas .... Ambrósio
 1996 - Pista Dupla

Filmography 
 2006 - O Cheiro do Ralo - Homem do Relógio
 2006 - Mulheres do Brasil - Rubão
 2006 - Trair e Coçar É Só Começar - Cristiano
 2003 - So Normal (Os Normais, o Filme)
 2002 - Querido Estranho - Carlos Alfredo

References

External links 

RPC: Mário Schoemberger dies at 56

1952 births
2008 deaths
Deaths from cancer in Paraná (state)
Male actors from Curitiba
Brazilian male stage actors
Brazilian male film actors
Brazilian male telenovela actors
Brazilian male television actors
Brazilian people of German-Jewish descent
Jewish Brazilian male actors